This is a list of AM radio stations in the United States having call signs beginning with the letters WT to WZ.

WT--

WU--

WV--

WW--

WX--

WY--

WZ--

See also 
 North American call sign

Lists of radio stations in the United States